The 1869 United States Senate election in New York was held on January 19, 1869, by the New York State Legislature. Incumbent Senator Edwin D. Morgan stood for a second term in office, but lost the support of the Republican legislative caucus in favor of Reuben Fenton.

Background
Republican Edwin D. Morgan had been elected in February 1863 to this seat, and his term would expire on March 3, 1869.

At the State election in November 1867, 17 Republicans and 15 Democrats were elected for a two-year term (1868-1869) in the State Senate. At the State election in November 1868, Democrat John T. Hoffman was elected Governor, and 75 Republicans and 53 Democrats were elected for the session of 1869 to the Assembly. The 92nd New York State Legislature met from January 5 to May 11, 1869, at Albany, New York.

Candidates

Republican caucus
The caucus of Republican State legislators met on January 16, Assemblyman John H. Selkreg presided. All 92 legislators were present. They nominated Ex-Governor Reuben E. Fenton for the U.S. Senate. The incumbent U.S. Senator Edwin D. Morgan was very keen on his re-election, but was voted down. Speaker Truman G. Younglove had held back the appointments to the standing Assembly committees until after the caucus, and subsequent election, of a U.S. Senator, and was accused by the Morgan men to have made a bargain to favor the Fenton men with appointments after the election was accomplished. After the caucus, comparing notes, the assemblymen discovered that some of the most important committee chairmanships had been promised to a dozen different members by Speaker Younglove.

Note: On the first ballot, 93 votes were cast, one too many, and it was annulled without announcing the result. The above stated result transpired unofficially. The blank vote caused some debate if the result was really invalidated by it, but it was finally agreed to take a second ballot.

Democratic caucus
The caucus of the Democratic State legislators met on January 18. State Senator Henry C. Murphy was again nominated, like in 1867.

Election
In the Assembly, Republicans DeWitt C. Hoyt (Saratoga Co.) and James O. Schoonmaker (Ulster Co.); and Democrats James Irving (NYC), Lawrence D. Kiernan (NYC), Harris B. Howard (Rensselaer Co.), James B. Pearsall (Queens), John Tighe (Albany Co.) and Moses Y. Tilden (Columbia Co.); did not vote.

In the State Senate, Republicans Matthew Hale (16th D.) and Charles Stanford (15th D.); and Democrats Cauldwell, Thomas J. Creamer, Michael Norton (5th D.) and John J. Bradley (7th D.); did not vote.

Result
Reuben E. Fenton was the choice of both the Assembly and the State Senate, and was declared elected.

Notes: 
The vote for Ex-Secretary of State Randall was cast by Henry C. Murphy.
The votes were cast on January 19, but both Houses met in a joint session on January 20 to compare nominations, and declare the result.

Aftermath
Fenton served one term, and remained in office until March 3, 1875.

Sources

Members of the 41st United States Congress
Result state election 1867 in The Tribune Almanac for 1868 compiled by Horace Greeley of the New York Tribune
Result state election 1868 in The Tribune Almanac for 1869 compiled by Horace Greeley of the New York Tribune
ALBANY.; Caucus of the Republican Members of the Legislature; Reuben E. Fenton Nominated United States Senator in NYT on January 17, 1869
ALBANY.; Election of United States Senator in NYT on January 20, 1869
 Result State Senate in Journal of the Senate (92nd Session) (1869; pg. 58f)
 Result Assembly in Journal of the Assembly (92nd Session) (1869; Vol. I, pg. 75f)

1869
New York
United States Senate